Megh Roddur (English: Clouds and Sunlight) is a 2013 Bengali film directed by Surajit Dhar and Sudarhan Basu and produced under the banner of DK Entertainment. Music of the film has been composed by Rishi Chanda. The film was released on 15 February 2013.

Plot
Madhuja Sen (Subhashree Ganguly), an actress comes to Shillong to shoot her film and happens to meet Arpan (Palash Ganguly), a bookshop owner. She eventually falls in love with Arpan. In the meantime, a sudden terrorist attack takes place in the town and has an influence in their lives.

Though the film is a close copy of Notting Hill (1999), it is not an absolute copy of the same.

Cast
 Subhashree Ganguly as Madhuja Sen
 Palash Ganguly as Arpan Ganguly
 Kumar as Tathagata
 Debolina Dutta as Paromita
 Sheli as Rupsha Ganguly
 Biplab Dasgupta
 Biswajit Chakraborty
 Anindya Banerjee
 Biswanath Basu
 Parthasarathi Chakraborty as Arpan's friend

Soundtrack

See also
 The Light: Swami Vivekananda
 Loveria
 Namte Namte
 Rupe Tomay Bholabo Na
 Damadol

References

Bengali-language Indian films
2010s Bengali-language films
2013 films